The Blenheim–Gilboa Pumped Storage Power Station is a pumped-storage hydroelectricity plant in the Catskill Mountains of New York State. It is used daily to cover peak demand.

The reservoir at the foot of the mountain was created by impounding the Schoharie Creek downstream from the village of Gilboa, New York. Water from this reservoir is sent through a concrete shaft up the mountain to the upper reservoir to be stored until it is needed. When power is needed, the water is sent back down the mountain into the lower reservoir, where it enters a power plant on the banks of the lower reservoir, and spins a series of turbines in the powerhouse. (This structure is almost completely underwater; only five feet of it can be seen above water when the reservoir is full). The water is sent back into the reservoir, flows over the dam that holds the reservoir back, and continues down the rest of the Schoharie Creek. The powerhouse, built in 1973, contained four Hitachi  pump/turbine units. Additionally, the old 285 MVA generator step up transformers were replaced with new 17kV/345kV, 325 MVA transformers. Overall plant cycle efficiency is 73%.

Blenheim–Gilboa Visitors Center 
The Blenheim-Gilboa Visitors Center is housed in a restored 18th century dairy barn, and features exhibits and interactive displays that demonstrate the science of energy and electricity, including how power is made and used. Admission to the center is free. The historic Lansing Manor House is a historic house museum adjacent to the Visitors Center. The Visitors Center, Lansing Manor House and the Power Project are located near Mine Kill State Park.

See also 

 List of power stations in the United States
 List of reservoirs and dams in New York
 New York energy law

References

External links
 NYPA Facilities: Blenheim-Gilboa Pumped Storage Power Project at the Internet Archive
 Blenheim–Gilboa Visitors Center

Energy infrastructure completed in 1973
Catskills
Dams in New York (state)
Hydroelectric power plants in New York (state)
Pumped-storage hydroelectric power stations in the United States
Science museums in New York (state)
Museums in Schoharie County, New York
Industry museums in New York (state)
Buildings and structures in Schoharie County, New York